The following lists are for team Football at the 1968 Summer Olympics – Men's Asian Qualifiers.

Qualifying tournaments

Group 1 
All matches played in Japan.

Japan qualify.

Group 2 
All matches played in Thailand.,  and  withdrew.

Thailand qualify.

Group 3 
All matches played in Israel.

Israel qualify.

Qualified team for Summer Olympics
The following teams from Asia qualified for the 1968 Summer Olympics.

References

External links
 RSSSF

1968